Yuko Ota may refer to

 Yuko Ota (speed skater), Japanese Olympic speed skater
  Yuko Ota, the illustrator of Johnny Wander